Kachap, also rendered as Kachab, may refer to:
 Kachap-e Kolva
 Kachap-e Olya
 Kachap-e Sofla